"The Nips Are Getting Bigger" is the debut single by Australian band Mental As Anything, released in July 1979. It was released as the first single from the album Get Wet and the song reached at number 16  on the Kent Music Report. The song was written by Mental As Anything lead vocalist Martin Plaza.

Track listing

Personnel 
 Martin Plaza — lead vocals, guitar    
 Greedy Smith — lead vocals, keyboards, harmonica
 Reg Mombassa — guitar, vocals  
 Peter O'Doherty — bass, guitar, vocals 
 Wayne de Lisle – drums

Charts

Weekly Charts

Year-end charts

References 

Mental As Anything songs
1979 songs
1979 debut singles
Regular Records singles
Virgin Records singles
Songs written by Martin Plaza